The North Gibson School Corporation is the second largest of the three public school governing institutions in Gibson County, Indiana, United States as well as one of the twenty largest in enrollment in Southwestern Indiana. The NGSC is responsible for a district including three townships of northern and northeastern Gibson County; Patoka, Washington, and White River. However, the Gibson-Pike-Warrick Special Education Cooperative sends the majority of the special needs students from Pike and Gibson Counties to Princeton Community High School, the high school of the district.

Schools
 Princeton Community High School
 Princeton Community Middle School
 Brumfield Elementary School
 Lowell North Elementary School
 Lowell South Elementary School

Museum
 Lyles Consolidated School

Other facilities
 North Gibson GED Program
 Southern Indiana Career & Technical Center

Bordering districts
 East Gibson School Corporation
 Pike County School Corporation
 South Gibson School Corporation
 South Knox School Corporation

References

External links
North Gibson School Corporation

School districts in Indiana
Southwestern Indiana
Education in Gibson County, Indiana
Princeton, Indiana